Bentham Science Publishers is a company that publishes scientific, technical, and medical journals and e-books. It publishes over 100 subscription-based academic journals and around 40 open access journals. 

As of 2021, 40 Bentham Science journals have received JCR impact factors, and they are a member of the Committee on Publication Ethics. Bentham Open, its open access division, has received criticism for questionable peer-review practices as well as invitation spam; it was listed as a "potential, possible, or probable predatory scholarly open access publisher" in Jeffrey Beall's list of predatory publishers, before the list went defunct.

History 
Bentham was incorporated in 1994 by Atta-ur-Rahman and his friend Matthew Honan as a private business entity at the Sharjah Airport International Free Trade Zone in the United Arab Emirates. An investigative profile from Sujag notes the publisher to have operated out of Pakistan — for the first six years, from the premises of International Center for Chemical and Biological Sciences and then, from private residential blocks at Karachi — in reality, under the banner of a tax-exempt proxy firm, owned by Rahman's sons.

As of 2022, the publisher, publishes more than 100 subscription-based journals, indexed in Scopus, Chemical Abstracts, MEDLINE, EMBASE, etc. Bentham Open Access published more than 150 peer-reviewed, free-to-view online journals under Bentham Open, which has since reduced to a roster of 39 open access journals.

Criticism of Bentham Open
Bentham Open journals claim to employ peer review; however, a fake paper that was generated using SCIgen in 2009 was accepted for publication, though it was never officially published and the publisher has since contended that the acceptance was a play-along to catch the author. The author, a graduate student at Cornell University, was motivated into the submission after being bombarded with unsolicited invitations to publish in Bentham's journals and offers to serve in their editorial boards for topics beyond his expertise. In consequence, some editors quit the collaboration with Bentham. In 2013, the now-discontinued The Open Bioactive Compounds Journal again accepted a blatantly bogus paper submitted as part of the Who's Afraid of Peer Review? sting.

Bentham Open has been accused of spamming scientists to become members of the editorial boards of its journals since 2008. In a 2017 study of invitation spam by publishers, Bentham Open was noted to be a habitual offender.

In 2009, the Bentham Open Science journal The Open Chemical Physics Journal had published a study contending dust from the World Trade Center attacks contained "active nanothermite", a well known 9/11 conspiracy theory. Following publication, the journal's editor-in-chief Marie-Paule Pileni claimed the article to have been published without their authorization, and resigned. In a July 2009 review of Bentham Open for The Charleston Advisor, Jeffrey Beall accused Bentham Open of exploiting the Open Access model to make quick money, and rejected that they employed any meaningful peer-review. Beall had since added Bentham Open to his list of "Potential, possible, or probable predatory scholarly open-access publishers".

See also 
 Category: Bentham Science Publishers academic journals

Notes

References

External links 
 

Book publishing companies of the United Arab Emirates
Academic publishing companies
Publishing companies established in 1994
Mass media in Sharjah (city)
Companies based in the Emirate of Sharjah
Open access publishers

Emirati companies established in 1994
Bentham Open academic journals